The Kyuyutingde is a river in Yakutia (Sakha Republic), Russia. It flows north of the Arctic Circle across a desolate area of Bulunsky District devoid of settlements and joins the Olenyok in its final major bend, where it begins to head northwards until the Laptev Sea.

The river gives its name to the Kyuyutingde Formation, a dolomite geological formation in the Olenyok Uplift.

Course  
The Kyuyutingde is a right tributary of the Olenyok. It flows first in a roughly southeastern direction, then it bends southwestwards for a short stretch and bends finally westwards, heading in that direction until the Olenyok floodplain, where it enters a low, marshy area with many small lakes to the north.

Owing to the harshness of the climate the river is frozen between early October and early June.

Bibliography
С. Н. Серебряков, Peculiarities in the formation and accommodation of Riphean stromatolites in Siberia

See also
List of rivers of Russia

References

External links 
Fishing & Tourism in Yakutia
СХЕМА КОМПЛЕКСНОГО ИСПОЛЬЗОВАНИЯ И ОХРАНЫ ВОДНЫХ ОБЪЕКТОВ БАССЕЙНА РЕКИ ОЛЕНЁК - Книга 2 ОЦЕНКА ЭКОЛОГИЧЕСКОГО СОСТОЯНИЯ И КЛЮЧЕВЫЕ ПРОБЛЕМЫ

Rivers of the Sakha Republic
Central Siberian Plateau
Tributaries of the Olenyok